is a Japanese football player who plays for Sanfrecce Hiroshima.

Playing career
Hayashi was born in Ibaraki on 9 August 1982. After graduating from high school, he joined J1 League club Sanfrecce Hiroshima in 2001. However he could hardly play in the match behind Takashi Shimoda. In 2005, he moved to J2 League club Consadole Sapporo. He became a regular goalkeeper in May 2005. Although he played as regular goalkeeper in 2006 season too, he lost his position in October. In 2007, he could not play at all in the match behind Takahiro Takagi. In June 2007, he moved to J2 club Vegalta Sendai and became a regular goalkeeper soon. In 2009, he played all 51 matches and Vegalta won the champions. From 2010, he played all 34 matches in J1 every season until 2013 season. Vegalta also finished at the 4th place in 2011 season and the 2nd place in 2012 season which is highest place in the club history. In 2014, he moved to Sanfrecce Hiroshima for the first time in 10 years. He played as regular goalkeeper and Sanfrecce won the champions in 2015 J1 League.

Club statistics

1Includes Japanese Super Cup, J.League Championship and FIFA Club World Cup.

Honours

Clubs

Sanfrecce Hiroshima
J1 League 2nd stage (1): 2015
J.League Championship (1): 2015
Japanese Super Cup (2) : 2014, 2016

Japan
EAFF East Asian Cup (1) : 2013

References

External links

Profile at Sanfrecce Hiroshima

1982 births
Living people
Association football people from Osaka Prefecture
People from Ibaraki, Osaka
Japanese footballers
J1 League players
J2 League players
Sanfrecce Hiroshima players
Hokkaido Consadole Sapporo players
Vegalta Sendai players
Association football goalkeepers